Mujhe Kucch Kehna Hai is a 2001 Indian Hindi-language romance film directed by Satish Kaushik and produced by Vashu Bhagnani. The film was the debut performance of Tusshar Kapoor, who starred alongside Kareena Kapoor. The film was an official remake of the 1998 Telugu film Tholi Prema. It was released on 25 May 2001.

Plot
The story revolves around a sensitive young adult Karan Singh (Tusshar Kapoor), who frequently skips college. Despite his poor academic performance, he displays many other talents. He is clever, an excellent musician, and plays in a band. His father constantly expresses his disappointment in him which often leads to Karan having outbursts of frustration and anger.  One day in a deserted street, he lays eyes on Pooja Saxena (Kareena Kapoor) for the first time and falls in love with her. Following this brief acquaintance, he looks all over for her but fails to find her. He slowly begins to lose hope in his quest, stops playing music and decides to move to another city with his uncle. While on his way there, his car breaks down, and he is forced to hitch a ride. To his amazement, he finds Pooja in the driver's seat. As they introduce themselves, an accident occurs when a truck collides with their car, which subsequently falls into a valley. Karan and Pooja find themselves hanging from a cliff, and even though Karan manages to haul Pooja back up the steep cliff, he loses his grip and falls into the ravine.

When Pooja regains consciousness, she assumes responsibility for Karan's death and offers to help in the search for his body. Meanwhile, Karan has survived the fall but is seriously injured and unconscious. He is found by a man who takes him to the hospital and soon after, Karan is reunited with his family. As he recovers, he reflects on how he should have confessed his love to Pooja in the few moments they were together. He also begins to focus on his education instead of his music. In time, Pooja arrives at his doorstep to apologize and offers her friendship. They become good friends and then Pooja tells Karan that she must leave for the United States for further studies. Devastated, he finally confesses his love for her. Pooja feels the same way and cannot deny her feelings for Karan, and promises that she will return to him once she completes her education. Karan agrees to patiently wait for her.

Cast
  Tusshar Kapoor as Karan Singh
 Kareena Kapoor as Pooja Saxena
  Dalip Tahil as Krishna Singh
 Amrish Puri as Subedar Balram Singh
 Rinke Khanna as Priya Saluja
 Vrajesh Hirjee as Chinku
 Alok Nath as Rana Virendra Pratap Singh
 Dinesh Hingoo
 Himani Shivpuri as Sushma Dhupia
 Yashpal Sharma as Batsman/gang leader
 Hemant Pandey as Dabbu
 Gopal Datt as Hrithik
 Darshan Kumar

Soundtrack
Anu Malik composed the soundtrack for the movie and Sameer penned the lyrics. According to the Indian trade website Box Office India, with around 32,00,000 units sold, this film's soundtrack album was the year's second highest-selling. The album was released in April 2001

Rehna Hai Tere Dil Mein which was composed by Vishal-Shekhar and sung by Shekhar. The film version of that song was sung by Shaan, Vishal Dadlani penned the lyrics. A remix version of Rabba mere Rabba was remixed by DJ khalif. These two songs were added as bonus tracks in the cassette which was released in February 2002

Track listing

Awards

 Filmfare Awards 2002
 Best Music Director, Anu Malik, Nominated
 Best Male Debut, Tusshar Kapoor, Won

 Star Screen Awards 2002
 Best Music Director, Anu Malik, Nominated
 Best Male Playback, Sonu Nigam, Nominated
 Best Story, Rumi Jaffery
 Most Promising Newcomer – Male, Tusshar Kapoor, Nominated

 Zee Cine Awards 2002
 Best Male Debut, Tusshar, Won
 Best Actor in a Comic Role, Vrajesh Hirjee, Nominated
 Best Music Director, Anu Malik, Nominated

Sequel
A sequel to the film was announced in 2011, however it never went into production.

References

External links
 
 
 Mujhe Kucch Kehna Hai at Indiafm.com

2000s Hindi-language films
2001 romantic drama films
2001 films
Films scored by Anu Malik
Hindi remakes of Telugu films
Indian romantic drama films
Films directed by Satish Kaushik